Artificially Expanded Genetic Information System (AEGIS) is a synthetic DNA analog experiment that uses some unnatural base pairs from the laboratories of the Foundation for Applied Molecular Evolution in Gainesville, Florida. AEGIS is a NASA-funded project to try to understand how extraterrestrial life may have developed.

The system uses twelve different nucleobases in its genetic code. These include the four canonical nucleobases found in DNA (adenine, cytosine, guanine and thymine) plus eight synthetic nucleobases). AEGIS includes S:B, Z:P, V:J and K:X base pairs.

See also

 Abiogenesis
 Astrobiology
 Hachimoji DNA
 xDNA
 Hypothetical types of biochemistry
 Xeno nucleic acid

References

Astrobiology
Biotechnology
Biological contamination
DNA
Genetic engineering